T.K.O. (also known as Urban Assault and Las reglas de la calle) is a 2007 American action thriller film directed by Declan Mulvey and starring Dianna Agron, Samantha Alarcon, Daz Crawford, Paul Green, Heidi Marie Wanser and Christian Boeving.

The film was produced by Nitasha Bhambree, Declan Mulvey, James Sicignano, Anisa Qureshi, Taylor Phillips.

Premise
In the city where image is everything, the criminal underworld holds a fight tournament where legends are born, and the men who own them rule the streets.

Cast

Dianna Agron as Dyanna
Samantha Alarcon as Skyler
Daz Crawford as Mick
Paul Green as Martin
Heidi Marie Wanser as Herrera
Christian Boeving as Rex
Fernando Chien as Lin
Jasper Cole as Cyrus
Joel King as Warren
Andre McCoy as Zendo
Anthony Ray Parker as Slim
Courtney Rice as Swan
Edwin Villa as Vesto
Lemar Knight as Mouse
Vishnu Seesahai as Vicious
Arron Yohe-Mellor as Jack

Reception

Audience response 
The film was received poorly by audiences, with IMDb users rating the film 3.4 out of 10 stars.

References

External links
 

2007 films
2007 action thriller films
2000s English-language films